Experimental theatre in the Arab world emerged in the post-colonial era as a fusion of Western theatrical traditions with local performance cultures such as music and dance. It is characterized by hybridity as it transposes Arabic traditional performances that were usually seen in public squares and marketplaces to theatre buildings. Experimental theatre in the Arab world has historically taken forms of Forum theatre by using audience participation as a way to smooth conflicts and resolve social tension. The audience is then transformed from a commonly passive into a proactive and involved one. It has been seen as a form of theatre of resistance and cultural activism as it deals with contemporary sensitive issues of the region such as the Israeli–Palestinian conflict, the Arab Spring, the role of women in Arabic society and religion. Such issues are often dealt with using humour. Throughout the years, experimental theatre in the Arab world has gradually converted into a synonymous of non-mainstream and underground art movements in which artists are always evolving and breaking down conventional markers between actors and spectators. The script combines the appropriation and dis-appropriation of Western models and is usually organic, more improvisational and self-reflexive. In the late 2000s, improvisational theatre which takes forms of stand up comedy shows has also emerged around the Arab world.

Context 

In some countries of the region, especially in Gulf States, the state is heavily involved with experimental theatre as a way to control its access. Egypt was the first country to launch an experimental theatre festival (Cairo International Festival for Experimental Theatre) through the Ministry of Culture in 1989. In other countries, experimental theatre has emerged in the streets and in the midst of political turmoil by artist-driven initiatives.

History 

In the late 20th century, Arab theatre had a strong will to break with Western forms as a way to reject European colonialist practices. Many artists, from North Africa to the Middle East, started favouring gatherings of the audience in a circle, a halqa, instead of Western proscenium theatre arrangement. Many independence movement politicians encouraged theatre activity as a way to empower the majority of illiterate people. After independence movements, an increasing number of Arab students who had studied abroad started to adapt Shakespeare and Molière plays within the local context. Meanwhile, local playwrights such as Yusif Idris started calling for an original Arabic theatre. Yusif Idris' masterpiece, "al-Farafir" (The Flipflops), is still considered a central reference for experimental theatre in the region. Tamer forms of theatre followed and the avant-garde idea of having an active spectator became a firmly established convention. After the Arab Spring, many plays by Middle-Eastern writers have revealed it through the lens of repression torture.
Influenced by the role of social media on the Arab uprisings, some artists have even expanded the process of engaging the audience in political activism in response to contemporary issues by introducing interactive means such as Internet and videos in the plays.

Categories of experimental theatre in the Arab world 

Experimental theatre in the Arab world can be divided into three geographical categories: the Middle East, Maghreb and the Persian Gulf states.

Middle East 

The Middle East has been the most enthusiastic and avant-gardiste experimental theatre in the Arab world. It mainly started in the early-90s with the Asthar Theatre who became the first company to adapt the methodology of the Theatre of the Oppressed on the Israeli–Palestinian conflict in the Middle East. Since the Arab Spring, new forms of experimental theatre, largely using techniques of the Theatre of the Oppressed have emerged at accelerated pace all around the region.

In Egypt, two months after the fall of Hosni Mubarak in February 2011, the Independent Culture Coalition launched a monthly culture festival El-Fan Midan (Art is a Square) which aims bringing arts and culture to the streets of Egypt. The drama troupe Masrah al-Maqhurin was included in the festival and performed interactive skits that required audience participation. Another theatric performance that originated after the Arab Spring is the Tahrir Monologues. This project consists of a mix of professional and amateur actors who go on stage and deliver short personal stories collected in Tahrir Square and through social networks. The stories are often emotional accounts of solidarity, fear and violence. In November 2011, theatre director and actress Nora Amin launched "The Egyptian National Project for Theatre of the Oppressed" in Alexandria.

Lebanese film-maker and theatre director Lucien Bourjeily brought improvisational theatre to the streets of Beirut during the 2008 conflict in Lebanon. In his last work "66 Minutes in Damascus" (2012), Bourjeily was inspired by the declarations of foreign journalists and local activists on Syrian detention centres. His play is considered as one of the most extreme kinds of interactive theatre, as the audience played the role of kidnapped tourists. More recently, Rabih Mroué and Lina Saleh put on stage "33 rounds and a few seconds" which is a play with many communication tools but without actors. The play is a huis clos which deals with the mysterious suicide of a human rights activist debated on Facebook in Lebanon.

Two prominent Palestinian actors, Edward Muallem and Iman Aoun established the Ashtar Theatre in Jerusalem in 1991 and four years later moved to Ramallah. Ashtar Theatre pioneered several programs focused on disadvantaged groups, such as women and youth in the region, based on the techniques of the Theatre of the Oppressed. Ashtar Theatre often travelled to remote areas in order to perform for marginalized audiences which allowed them to bring an appreciation of theatre to new audiences in cities, villages, and refugee camps throughout Palestine. In 2005, Ashtar Theatre's program introduced the idea of Legislative theatre in the region. In 2007, Ashtar Theatre became the official “Middle East Regional Centre for Theatre of the Oppressed” in collaboration with Augusto Boal’s Centre for the Theatre of the Oppressed in Rio de Janeiro, Brazil and started conducting regional training in Yemen and Iraq. Another theatre initiative was held by the Seeds of Peace Center via the bi-national movement of Israelis and Palestinians Combatants for Peace. Image theatre was used with separate Israeli and Palestinian groups to reveal conflicting views. Forum theatre techniques were also deployed that led to “spect-actor” interventions with separate Jewish and Arab students focusing on violence-charged scenarios.

In Jordan, Prof. Fadi Skeiker started a free space for experimentation in performing arts, the Amman Theatre Lab. Based on Henry Giroux's concept of border pedagogy, he studied the role of applied theatre in empowering orphan Palestinian youths who live in one of the biggest refugee camps in the Middle East, the Baqa'a camp.

Maghreb 

Contrarily to typical experimental drama whose audience is rather an intellectual élite, experimental theatre in the Maghreb is more popular and reaches wider audiences. The performances take place in public spaces amidst spectators who form a halqa (circle) around the storyteller. They consist of storytelling of daily life or historical events by a narrator. The narrator chooses a subject which is usually historical or religious and starts improvising praise mainly using colloquial Arabic. The script is unfinished and full of holes which gives freedom to the actor to improvise. The performance often depends on the virtuosity of a single person which performs various roles. Storytellers include dramatic elements such as dancing and singing. During French occupation in the region, storytellers had such a success that some were censored by authorities. Pioneers of this genre of popular theatre in Algeria are Abdelkader Alloula and Rachid Ksentini. In Morocco, Mohammed Kaghat is seen as one of the best representatives of the Moroccan murtajala, a subversive, comic and ironic improvised representation of theatre practices. In Tunisia, an Experimental Theatre Festival has taken place in Medenine since 1992.

Gulf States 
Experimental theatre creation process in Gulf states has a strong state involvement. In 2011, Gulf states launched an innovative digital project named "Gulf stage". It consists of an online platform that shares recorded performances of young theatre companies from Bahrain, Kuwait, Oman, Qatar, Saudi Arabia and the United Arab Emirates with a global audience. The featuring companies were chosen in a contest in which the actors and the creative teams of each participating country had only one day to build the set, rehearse and perform. The project involved many partners: the British Council, Digital Theatre, the Ministry of Culture, Arts and Heritage of Qatar and the Qatar Foundation.

See also 
- STAR TOO is an experimental theatre project based in Dubai. Their latest production "Is It Real?" combined a giant projector box, shadow puppet theatre and a 360 degree experience for the audience.

- Leish Troupe is one of the few independent and experimental theatre groups in Syria. Their latest production dealt with identity and analysed the roles assigned to men and women in society. In the performance, male and female audience are divided. While the female audience sees the portray of the rituals assigned to women, the male audience sees those that men go through during a funeral.

- ImproBeirut was founded in March 2008 by director Lucien Bourjeily as the first professional improvisational theatre shows in the Middle East. ImproBeirut has been in innovating improvisational formats by launching theatre sports and dimensional interactive improvised theatre or 4D theatre.

- An Enemy of the People – an Arabic adaptation of Ibsen's play directed by Nora Amin in Egypt during 2013.

References 

Arab culture